Nightshift is the 11th studio album by the Commodores, released by Motown Records on January 15, 1985. It was the group's last album on the Motown label before switching to Polydor.

Background 
Nightshift is the Commodores' second album without Lionel Richie, who left the band in 1982, and their last album with their original bass guitarist Ronald LaPread. Their previous album Commodores 13 (1983) had featured interim lead vocalist Harold Hudson of Mean Machine. For Nightshift the Commodores permanently replaced Richie with British-born J.D. Nicholas, formerly of Heatwave. Dennis Lambert was chosen as producer, the Commodores hoping to find the same magic created by producer/arranger James Anthony Carmichael, with whom they had worked since 1974 and who was a major impetus in their earlier success.

Other musicians that play on this album include: Peter Wolf, Paul Fox, John Robinson, Neil Stubenhaus, Jeff Lorber, Peter Maunu, Harold Hudson, Dennis Lambert, Paulinho da Costa, Vinnie Colaiuta, Jerry Hey, Gary Grant, Gary Herbig and Larry Williams.

Chart performance 
Despite the album's middling reviews, it remained in the top of the R&B charts in the US for a month, and it peaked at #3 on the pop chart. By and large, the album's popularity was due to its hit title track, "Nightshift". Written by Walter Orange, Dennis Lambert and Franne Golde, "Nightshift" was the band's biggest post-Lionel Richie hit, reaching #3 on The Billboard Hot 100, and #1 on Billboard's chart for top R&B/hip-hop singles. Paying tribute to the late soul singers Marvin Gaye and Jackie Wilson, who both died in 1984, "Nightshift" also earned the group its only Grammy.

Though not as successful as the "Nightshift" single, two other tracks from the album were released. Regarded as an out-of-the-ordinary track for the Commodores, "Animal Instinct", with Orange on lead vocals, was released almost six months after "Nightshift", and reached #23 on the R&B charts, and only #43 on the pop charts. The single, "Janet," barely made Billboard's Top 100 and never made it into the R&B top 50. However, it did reach #8 on the Adult Contemporary charts.

With the following album, United, only reaching #17 on the R&B charts, Nightshift became The Commodores last album to enter the top ten, and the song "Nightshift" was their second-to-last song to reach the top ten, with "Goin' to the Bank" being their last, in 1986.

Track listing 
 "Animal Instinct" (Martin Page) - 4:54
 "Nightshift" (Dennis Lambert, Franne Golde, Walter Orange) - 5:03
 "I Keep Running" (Harold Hudson, Shirley King, William King) - 4:11
 "Lay Back" (Dennis Lambert, Franne Golde, Michael Page, Milan Williams) - 5:01
 "Slip of the Tongue" (Lenny Macaluso, Peter Beckett) - 3:53
 "Play This Record Twice" (Kevin Smith, Ronald LaPread) - 4:22
 "Janet" (Bobby Caldwell, Franne Golde, Paul Fox) - 3:41
 "Woman in My Life" (Keith Stegall, Patrick Henderson) - 3:34
 "Lighting Up the Night" (Diane Warren, Jeff Lorber) - 4:02

Charts

Personnel 
Commodores
 William King – keyboards, backing vocals, arrangements (3)
 Ronald LaPread – bass, backing vocals
 J. D. Nicholas – lead vocals (2, 3, 4), backing vocals
 Walter Orange – drums, lead vocals (1, 2, 5-9), backing vocals
 Milan Williams – keyboards

Additional musicians
 Gregory Alexander – backing vocals
 Tracee Augcomfor – backing vocals
 Vinnie Colaiuta – drums
 Paulinho da Costa – percussion
 Paul Fox – arrangements (3, 7), synthesizers, bass programming, drum programming
 Doris Garrett – backing vocals
 Siedah Garrett – backing vocals
 Gary Grant – trumpet (9), flugelhorn (9)
 Patricia Hamlin – backing vocals
 Gary Herbig – saxophones (9)
 Jerry Hey – horn arrangement (9), trumpet (9), flugelhorn (9)
 Harold Hudson – arrangements (3), synthesizers
 Phillip Ingram – backing vocals
 Paul Jackson Jr. – arrangements (6), synthesizers, guitars, bass programming, drum programming
 Dennis Lambert – synthesizers, percussion, backing vocals, BGV arrangements
 Jeff Lorber – arrangements (9), synthesizers, bass programming, drum programming
 Peter Maunu – guitars
 Darryl Phinnessee – backing vocals
 Ambrose Price – backing vocals
 Sheldon Reynolds – backing vocals
 John Robinson – drums
 Neil Stubenhaus – bass
 David Swanson – backing vocals
 "Ready" Freddie Washington – bass
 Larry Williams – saxophones (9)
 Peter Wolf – arrangements (1, 2, 4, 5, 8), keyboards, synthesizers, bass programming, drum programming

Production 
 Producer – Dennis Lambert
 Co-Producer on "I Keep Running" – William King 
 Associate Producer, Engineer – Jeremy Smith
 Associate Engineer – Paul Ericksen
 Assistant Engineers – Bino Espinoza and Fred Law
 Mastered by John Matousek at Motown/Hitsville U.S.A Recording Studios (Hollywood, CA).
 Album Coordination – Marrianne Pellicci and Gail Pierson
 Art Direction – Johnny Lee
 Design – Janet Levinson
 Photography – Ron Slenzak
 Management – BNB Associates, Dan Cleary

References

External links 
 The official Commodores website
 [ AllMusic.com: Nightshift Overview]

Commodores albums
1985 albums
Motown albums